Akali may refer to:

 In the context of Sikhism, "Akali" ("pertaining to Akal or the Supreme Power", "divine") may refer to:
 any member of the Khalsa, i.e. the collective body of baptized Sikhs
 a member of the Akali movement (1919-1925)
 a politician of the Akali Dal political parties
 a term for the Nihang, a Sikh order
 Akali (League of Legends), the Rogue Assassin, a playable character in the video game League of Legends and its associated virtual band K/DA

See also
 Alkali (disambiguation)
 Akari (disambiguation)